Styphelia is a genus of shrubs in the family Ericaceae, native from Indo-China through the Pacific to Australia. Most have minute or small leaves with a sharp tip, single, tube-shaped flowers arranged in leaf axils and with the ends of the petals rolled back with hairs in the inside of the tube.

Description
Plants in the genus Styphelia are usually erect or spreading shrubs that have egg-shaped, elliptical or oblong, more or less sessile leaves with many fine, almost parallel veins and a sharp point on the tip. The flowers are usually arranged singly in leaf axils with small bracts grading to larger bracteoles at the base and five, usually coloured sepals. The petals are fused to form a cylindrical tube with their tips rolled back. The inside of the petal tube is hairy and the five stamens and thread-like style extend beyond the end of the tube. The fruit is a drupe with a dry or slightly fleshy mesocarp and a hard endocarp.

Taxonomy and naming
The genus Styphelia was first formally described in 1795 by James Edward Smith in his book A Specimen of the Botany of New Holland. The name Styphelia is from an ancient Greek word meaning "tough" or "harsh", referring to the "stiff, prickly leaves and general habit" of the genus.

Species list
The following is a list of species of Styphelia accepted by Plants of the World Online as at October 2022:

 Styphelia abnormis (Sond.) F.Muell. (Northern Borneo to New Guinea)
 Styphelia abscondita J.J.Sm. (New Guinea)
 Styphelia acervata (Hislop & A.J.G.Wilson) Hislop, Crayn & Puente-Lel. J.J.Sm. (W.A.)
 Styphelia acuminata (R.Br.) Spreng. (N.T.)
 Styphelia adscendens R.Br. - golden heath (N.S.W., S.A., Vic., Tas.)
 Styphelia allittii (F.Muell.) F.Muell. (W.A.)
 Styphelia angustiflora Hislop & Puente-Lel. (W.A.)
 Styphelia angustifolia DC. (N.S.W.)
 Styphelia appressa (R.Br.) Spreng. (N.S.W., Qld., Vic.)
 Styphelia attenuata (A.Cunn.) F.Muell. (N.S.W., Qld., Vic.)
 Styphelia balansae Virot (New Caledonia)
 Styphelia biflora (R.Br.) Spreng. (N.S.W., Qld., Vic.)
 Styphelia blakei Hislop, Crayn & Puente-Lel. (Qld.)
 Styphelia blepharolepis F.Muell. (W.A.)
 Styphelia brevicuspis (Benth.) F.Muell. (W.A.)
 Styphelia breviflora (F.Muell.) F.Muell. (W.A.)
 Styphelia capillaris Hislop & Puente-Lel. (W.A.)
 Styphelia cernua Hislop & Puente-Lel. (W.A.)
 Styphelia chlorantha Hislop & A.J.G.Wilson (W.A.)
 Styphelia ciliosa Hislop & Puente-Lel. (W.A.)
 Styphelia clelandii (Cheel) J.H.Willis (S.A., Vic.)
 Styphelia coelophylla (A.Cunn. ex DC.) Hislop, Crayn & Puente-Lel. (W.A.)
 Styphelia cognata A.R.Bean (Qld.)
 Styphelia compacta (R.Br.) Spreng. (W.A.)
 Styphelia conchifolia (Strid) Hislop, Crayn & Puente-Lel. (W.A.)
 Styphelia concinna (Benth.) F.Muell. (W.A.)
 Styphelia conferta (Benth.) F.Muell. (N.S.W., Qld.)
 Styphelia conostephioides (DC.) F.Muell. (W.A.)
 Styphelia cordifolia (Lindl.) F.Muell. (N.S.W., S.A., Vic., W.A.)
 Styphelia corynocarpa (Sond.) F.Muell. (W.A.)
 Styphelia coryphila (Guillaumin) Sleumer (New Caledonia)
 Styphelia crassiflora F.Muell. (W.A.)
 Styphelia crassifolia (Sond.) F.Muell. (W.A.)
 Styphelia cuspidata (R.Br.) Spreng. (Qld.)
 Styphelia cymbiformis (A.Cunn. ex DC.) F.Muell. (W.A.)
 Styphelia cymbulae (Labill.) Spreng. (Fiji, New Caledonia, Vanuatu)
 Styphelia dammarifolia (Brongn. & Gris) F.Muell. (New Caledonia)
 Styphelia decussata Hislop, Crayn & Puente-Lel. (W.A.)
 Styphelia deformis (R.B.) Spreng. (N.S.W., Qld.)
 Styphelia densifolia Hislop, Crayn & Puente-Lel. (W.A.)
 Styphelia deserticola Hislop (W.A.)
 Styphelia dielsiana (E.Pritz.) Sleumer (W.A.)
 Styphelia discolor (Sond.) Hislop, Crayn & Puente-Lel. (W.A.)
 Styphelia disjuncta Hislop & Puente-Lel. (W.A.)
 Styphelia enervia (Guillaumin) Sleumer (New Caledonia)
 Styphelia epacridis (DC.) F.Muell. (W.A.)
 Styphelia erectifolia Hislop, Crayn & Puente-Lel. (W.A.)
 Styphelia ericoides Sm. (N.S.W., Qld., S.A., Tas., Vic.)
 Styphelia erubescens F.Muell. (W.A.)
 Styphelia esquamata (R.Br.) Spreng. (N.S.W., Qld., Tas., Vic.)
 Styphelia exarrhena (F.Muell.) F.Muell. - desert styphelia (S.A., Vic.)
 Styphelia exolasia F.Muell. (N.S.W.)
 Styphelia exserta (F.Muell.) Sleumer (W.A.)
 Styphelia filamentosa Hislop & Puente-Lel. (W.A.)
 Styphelia filifolia Hislop & Puente-Lel. (W.A.)
 Styphelia flavescens (Sond.) F.Muell. (W.A.)
 Styphelia fletcheri (Maiden & Betche) Maiden & Betche (N.S.W., Qld., Vic.)
 Styphelia flexifolia (R.Br.) Spreng. (Qld.)
 Styphelia foliosa (Sond.) Hislop, Crayn & Puente-Lel. (W.A.)
 Styphelia forbesii Sleumer (Lesser Sunda Islands)
 Styphelia geniculata Crayn (Qld.)
 Styphelia glaucifolia (W.Fitzg.) Hislop, Crayn & Puente-Lel. (W.A.)
 Styphelia grandiflora (Pedley) Hislop, Crayn & Puente-Lel. (Qld.)
 Styphelia hainesii F.Muell. (W.A.)
 Styphelia hamulosa (E.Pritz.) Sleumer (W.A.)
 Styphelia hispida (E.Pritz.) Sleumer (W.A.)
 Styphelia humifusa (Cav.) Pers. (N.S.W, S.A., Tas., Vic.)
 Styphelia imbricata (R.Br.) Spreng. (Qld.)
 Styphelia inopinata (Hislop) Hislop, Crayn & Puente-Lel. (W.A.)
 Styphelia insularis (A.Cunn. ex DC.) Hislop, Crayn & Puente-Lel. (W.A.)
 Styphelia intertexta A.S.George (W.A.)
 Styphelia javanica (Zoll. & Moritzi) J.J.Sm.. (Java)
 Styphelia kingiana F.Muell. (W.A.)
 Styphelia laeta R.Br. (N.S.W.)
 Styphelia lanata Hislop, Crayn & Puente-Lel. (W.A.)
 Styphelia lavarackii (Pedley) Hislop, Crayn & Puente-Lel. (Qld.)
 Styphelia leptantha (Benth.) F.Muell. (W.A.)
 Styphelia leptospermoides (R.Br.) Spreng. (N.S.W., Qld.)
 Styphelia lissanthoides (F.Muell.) F.Muell. (S.A., W.A.)
 Styphelia longifolia R.Br. (N.S.W.)
 Styphelia longissima Hislop, Crayn & Puente-Lel. (W.A.)
 Styphelia longistylis (Brongn. & Gris) Sleumer (New Caledonia)
 Styphelia lucens A.R.Bean (Qld.)
 Styphelia macrocalyx (Sond.) F.Muell. (W.A.)
 Styphelia macrocarpa (Schltr.) Sleumer (New Caledonia)
 Styphelia malayana (Jack) J.J.Sm. (Borneo, Cambodia, Malaya, Myanmar, New Guinea, Sumatra, Thailand, Vietnam)
 Styphelia margarodes (R.Br.) Spreng. (N.S.W., Qld.)
 Styphelia marginata (W.Fitzg.) Hislop, Crayn & Puente-Lel. (W.A.)
 Styphelia melaleucoides F.Muell. (W.A.)
 Styphelia microcalyx (Sond.) F.Muell. (W.A.)
 Styphelia microdonta (F.Muell. ex Benth) F.Muell. (W.A.)
 Styphelia mitchellii (Benth.) F.Muell. (Qld.)
 Styphelia multiflora Spreng. (Chatham Island, N.S.W., Vic., W.A.)
 Styphelia mutica (R.Br.) F.Muell. (N.S.W., Qld., Vic.)
 Styphelia nana (M.I.Dawson & Heenan) Hislop, Crayn & Puente-Lel. (New Zealand South Island)
 Styphelia neoanglica (F.Muell. ex Benth.) F.Muell. (N.S.W., Qld.)
 Styphelia nesophila (DC.) Sleumer (N.S.W., New Zealand, Tasmania, Victoria)
 Styphelia nitens Sleumer (W.A.)
 Styphelia oblongifolia (A.J.G.Wilson & Hislop) Hislop, Crayn & Puente-Lel. (W.A.)
 Styphelia obtecta (Benth.) F.Muell. (W.A.)
 Styphelia pallida (R.Br.) Spreng. (W.A.)
 Styphelia pancheri 9Brongn. & Gris) F.Muell. (New Caledonia)
 Styphelia pendula (R.Br.) Spreng. (W.A.)
 Styphelia pentapagona F.Muell. (W.A.)
 Styphelia perileuca J.M.Powell - montane green five-corners (N.S.W.)
 Styphelia piliflora Crayn (Qld.)
 Styphelia planifolia (Sond.) Sleumer (W.A.)
 Styphelia pogonocalyx (F.Muell. ex Benth.) F.Muell. (W.A.)
 Styphelia propinqua (R.Br.) Spreng. (W.A.)
 Styphelia prostrata (R.Br.) F.Muell. (W.A.)
 Styphelia psiloclada J.M.Powell (N.S.W.)
 Styphelia psilopus (Stschegl.) Hislop, Crayn & Puente-Lel. (W.A.)
 Styphelia pubescens (S.Moore) Hislop, Crayn & Puente-Lel. (W.A.)
 Styphelia quartzitica Hislop (W.A.)
 Styphelia racemulosa (DC.) F.Muell. (W.A.)
 Styphelia rectiloba Hislop (W.A.)
 Styphelia recurvisepala (C.T.White) Sleumer (N.S.W., Qld.)
 Styphelia retrorsa Hislop, Crayn & Puente-Lel. (W.A.)
 Styphelia rigidus (A.Cunn. ex DC.) Hislop, Crayn & Puente-Lel. (W.A.)
 Styphelia riparia (N.A.Wakef.) J.H.Willis (Vic.)
 Styphelia rotundifolia (R.Br.) Spreng. (W.A.)
 Styphelia rufa (Lindl.) F.Muell. (N.S.W., S.A., Vic.)
 Styphelia rupicola (C.T.White) Sleumer (Qld.)
 Styphelia ruscifolia (R.Br.) Spreng. (N.T., Qld.)
 Styphelia saxicola Hislop (W.A.)
 Styphelia serratifolia (DC.) Hislop, Crayn & Puente-Lel. (W.A.)
 Styphelia setigera (R.Br.) Spreng. (N.S.W., Vic.)
 Styphelia sieberi (DC.) Hislop, Crayn & Puente-Lel. (N.S.W., Qld., Vic.)
 Styphelia sonderensis (J.H.Willis) Hislop, Crayn & Puente-Lel. (N.T.)
 Styphelia decussata Hislop, Crayn & Puente-Lel. (W.A.)
 Styphelia stomarrhena (Sond.) Sleumer (W.A.)
 Styphelia striata (R.Br.) Spreng. (W.A.)
 Styphelia strongylophylla (F.Muell.) F.Muell. (W.A.)
 Styphelia subulata (F.Muell.) Hislop, Crayn & Puente-Lel. (W.A.)
 Styphelia sulcata Hislop & Puente-Lel. (W.A.)
 Styphelia tamminensis (E.Pritz.) Sleumer (W.A.)
 Styphelia tecta (R.Br.) Spreng. (W.A)
 Styphelia tenuiflora Lindl. - common pinheath (W.A.)
 Styphelia tortifolia Hislop, Crayn & Puente-Lel. (W.A.)
 Styphelia trichostyla (J.M.Powell) Hislop, Crayn & Puente-Lel. (N.S.W., Qld.)
 Styphelia triflora Andrews - pink five-corners (Qld., N.S.W., A.C.T.)
 Styphelia tubiflora Sm. - red five-corner (N.S.W.)
 Styphelia veillonii Virot (New Caledonia)
 Styphelia viridis Andrews (N.S.W., Qld.)
 Styphelia wetarensis J.J.Sm. (Lesser Sunda Island)
 Styphelia williamsiorum Hislop & Puente-Lel. (W.A.)
 Styphelia woodsii (F.Muell.) F.Muell. (S.A., Vic., W.A.)
 Styphelia xerophylla (DC.) F.Muell. (W.A.)
 Styphelia yorkensis (Pedley) Hislop, Crayn & Puente-Lel. (Qld.)

Distribution
Species of Styphelia occur in all Australian mainland states and the Australian Capital Territory. Other species are found northwards to Indo-China.

References

 
Ericaceae genera
Ericales of Australia